Floria Márquez (born February 11, 1950 in Caracas) is a Venezuelan singer and actress. She grew up in a musical family, her mother was a classical-trained pianist, and one of her brothers is singer Rudy Marquez.

She began to sing professionally at adult age, performing the Latin music genre called Bolero (the Latin music equivalent to the American "Ballad").

She has performed in Colombia, Bahamas, Aruba, Mexico, Argentina, and the USA, where she has successfully performed several times at the famous Fontainebleau Hilton Hotel in Miami Beach. She has appeared onstage with Latin stars such as Armando Manzanero, Los Panchos, Lucho Gatica, Oscar D'León, Cheo Feliciano, among many others.
 
Along with her musical career, Floria Márquez has performed as an actress in two plays "Ella Sí Canta Boleros", and the Café-Concert "La Cosa Es Amar", show that has been very successful at Venezuela's theaters with more than 200 shows performed.

Márquez has also performed more than 34 concerts with several symphony orchestras in Venezuela, a privilege granted to few popular artists in her country.  She performs an average of 70 shows each year.

She is married to Venezuelan musical producer and arranger Pedrito López, has two daughters and three grandchildren.

Discography
Una Noche Con Floria Márquez
Algo Más Que Boleros
Palabras De Mujer
La Cosa Es Amar
10 Años De Amor
Exitos De Floria Márquez
Sin Fecha De Vencimiento

External links
 Floria Márquez website 

1950 births
Living people
People from Caracas
20th-century Venezuelan women singers